John Watkiss (born 28 March 1941 in Willenhall, England) is a former football (soccer) defender. He was a member of the Australian 1974 FIFA World Cup squad in West Germany and represented Australia 31 times between 1965 and 1974 scoring 4 times.

Watkiss Street in the Sydney suburb of Glenwood is named for him.

References

1941 births
Living people
English emigrants to Australia
Australian soccer players
Australia international soccer players
Australian expatriate sportspeople in England
1974 FIFA World Cup players
Sutherland Sharks FC players
Association football defenders
People from Willenhall